Paula J. Raschke-Lind (born December 18, 1962) is an American politician who served as a Democratic member of the Illinois House of Representatives from 1993 to 1994.

Biography
Born in Manitowoc, Wisconsin, Raschke-Lind received her associate degree from Rock Valley College. She lived in Rockford, Illinois and was a legislative aide to Illinois state representative Edolo J. Giorgi. Raschke-Lind was appointed to the Illinois House of Representatives when Giorgi died. Raschke-Lind is a Democrat. She lost the 1994 Democratic primary to Doug Scott, who went on to win the November general election.

Notes

1962 births
Living people
People from Manitowoc, Wisconsin
Politicians from Rockford, Illinois
Women state legislators in Illinois
Democratic Party members of the Illinois House of Representatives
21st-century American women